Kihei Issaiah Clark (born January 25, 2000) is an American college basketball player for the Virginia Cavaliers of the Atlantic Coast Conference (ACC).

Early life
Clark was born in Tarzana, Los Angeles as the oldest son of Malik and Sharon Clark. His father is Chinese and African American and his mother is Filipino. He was named after Kihei, Hawaii, the town where his father proposed to his wife. Clark took part in soccer and martial arts until focusing on basketball at age eight. He was inspired to start playing basketball by his father, who played the sport in college. He would often play with his childhood friend Cameron Boyce. Clark grew up watching National Basketball Association (NBA) players Steve Nash and Chris Paul. He played youth travel basketball for Kings Academy in the Conejo Valley where he was coached by Adam Mazarei, a future NBA assistant coach for the Memphis Grizzlies. In eighth grade, Clark attended the Buckley School, a K–12 private school in Sherman Oaks. At the time, school athletic director Byrd Newman-Milic said that Clark "could probably start for (the basketball team) right now."

High school career
In his freshman season in 2014–15, Clark played basketball for the Buckley School, averaging 15.2 points and six assists per game. He helped his team reach the CIF Southern Section Division 4A semifinals, scoring 16 points in a 69–51 loss to Campbell Hall School, and collected All-Liberty League honors. For his sophomore year, Clark transferred to William Howard Taft Charter High School in Woodland Hills. In the 2015–16 season, he averaged 12.1 points and 6.9 assists, earning team most valuable player (MVP) and all-conference recognition. As a junior, Clark averaged 18.9 points, 7.1 assists, and 4.2 rebounds per game, winning team MVP, all-city, and all-conference accolades. During the season, he surpassed the school record by recording 22 assists in a single game. In the summer of 2017, Clark was named MVP of the Nike Elite Youth Basketball League (EYBL) Peach Jam after leading his Oakland Soldiers team to a title. In his 2017–18 senior season, he averaged 19.4 points, 7.2 assists and 2.9 steals, shooting 41 percent on three-pointers. Clark was a consensus three-star recruit. He first verbally committed to play college basketball for UC Davis but decommitted in August 2017 because he felt that he could play at a higher level. On October 2, 2017, he committed to Virginia after also considering Gonzaga and UCLA.

College career

On November 6, 2018, Clark made his debut for Virginia, recording four points and six assists, his eventual season-high mark, in a 73–42 win over Towson. He scored a season-high 12 points on January 26, 2019, in an 82–55 victory over Notre Dame. On March 29, in the Sweet Sixteen round of the 2019 NCAA tournament, Clark posted 12 points and six assists, matching career-bests in both categories in a 53–49 win over 12th-seeded Oregon. In an Elite Eight match-up versus third-seeded Purdue two days later, he made a 40-foot pass that allowed teammate Mamadi Diakite to make a buzzer-beating shot and force overtime. Virginia won the game, 80–75, behind Clark's five assists. On April 8, he recorded three points and four assists in 33 minutes to help his team win the national championship over third-seeded Texas Tech. Through 38 games as a freshman, Clark made 20 starts, averaging 4.5 points and 2.6 assists in 26.8 minutes per game.

Clark set a new career-high of 15 points on November 19, helping the Cavaliers defeat Vermont 61–55. On February 26, 2020, Clark made a three-pointer with 2.1 seconds left in a 56–53 victory at Virginia Tech and finished with seven points, six rebounds and six assists. He scored 18 points, including a three-pointer with 28 seconds remaining, on March 7 in a 57–54 win over Louisville. At the conclusion of the regular season, Clark was selected to the Third Team All-ACC.

On February 23, 2022, Clark made a new career-high in points in a loss to Duke with 25 points on 9-of-15 shooting. He also made his 500th assist in that game. As a senior, Clark was named Honorable Mention All-ACC.

Career statistics

College

|-
| style="text-align:left;"| 2018–19
| style="text-align:left;"| Virginia
| 38 || 20 || 26.8 || .350 || .341 || .825 || 2.3 || 2.6 || .7 || .0 || 4.5
|-
| style="text-align:left;"| 2019–20
| style="text-align:left;"| Virginia
| 30 || 30 || 37.1 || .375 || .375 || .876 || 4.2 || 5.9 || 1.2 || .1 || 10.8
|-
| style="text-align:left;"| 2020–21
| style="text-align:left;"| Virginia
| 25 || 23 || 34.0 || .411 || .323 || .734 || 2.0 || 4.5 || .7 || .0 || 9.5
|-
| style="text-align:left;"| 2021–22
| style="text-align:left;"| Virginia
| 35 || 35 || 36.0 || .387 || .346 || .782 || 2.9 || 4.4 || .9 || .1 || 10.0
|-
| style="text-align:left;"| 2022–23
| style="text-align:left;"| Virginia
| 33 || 33 || 33.2 || .399 || .352 || .767 || 2.6 || 5.4 || 1.0 || .1 || 10.7
|- class="sortbottom"
| style="text-align:center;" colspan="2"| Career
| 161 || 141 || 33.2 || .386 || .349 || .795 || 2.8 || 4.5 || .9 || .1 || 8.9

Personal life
His father Malik Clark played basketball for NCAA Division II program Hawaii–Hilo. Later in his life, Malik began running a construction and trucking company. Clark is of Filipino descent through his mother Sharon, whose family was from Ilocos and moved to Hawaii. He has two brothers, Nalu and Shaka.

References

External links
Virginia Cavaliers bio

2000 births
Living people
American men's basketball players
American people of Ilocano descent
American sportspeople of Filipino descent
Basketball players from Los Angeles
People from Tarzana, Los Angeles
Point guards
Virginia Cavaliers men's basketball players